Ian Ross Griffith (25 September 1925 – 8 November 1992) was an Australian politician and a member of the New South Wales Legislative Assembly from 1956 until 1978. He was a member of the Liberal Party and held ministerial positions in the governments of Sir Robert Askin and Eric Willis.

Early life
Griffith was born in Caulfield, Victoria and was the son of a chemical analyst. He was educated at Melbourne High School and worked as a bank officer for the National Bank of Australasia eventually becoming a public relations officer in Sydney. During the Second World War, he served with the Royal Australian Navy and reached the rank of Lieutenant.

State Parliament
Griffith entered the New South Wales parliament at the 1956 election as the Liberal member for Sutherland. He defeated the sitting Labor member, Tom Dalton, who won the seat in a surprise result at the previous election. The Liberal Party's hold on Sutherland was adversely affected by a redistribution at the 1959 election and Griffith successfully contested the new and safer seat of Cronulla.He retained the seat until he lost the Liberal Party's endorsement before the 1978 election and retired from public life.

Government
Griffith was promoted to the position of Chief Secretary and Minister for Tourism, under Sir Robert Askin, between 1972 and 1975. He was demoted to the backbench when Askin retired and was succeeded as Premier by Tom Lewis but was appointed as the Minister for Housing in the short lived government of Eric Willis between January and May 1976.

References

 

Members of the New South Wales Legislative Assembly
Liberal Party of Australia members of the Parliament of New South Wales
1925 births
1992 deaths
20th-century Australian politicians
Chief secretaries (British Empire)
Royal Australian Navy personnel of World War II
Royal Australian Navy officers
People from Caulfield, Victoria
Politicians from Melbourne
People educated at Melbourne High School
Military personnel from Melbourne
Australian bankers